General Alvarado Partido is a partido on the Atlantic Coast of Buenos Aires Province in Argentina.

Economy 

Like many of the partidos on the Atlantic coast of Buenos Aires Province, the economy of General Alvarado Partido is dominated by seasonal tourism.

The vast majority of the tourists come from Gran Buenos Aires in the summer holiday season (December–February).

Settlements 

 Miramar
 Centinela del Mar

External links 

  General Alvarado Website

1891 establishments in Argentina
Partidos of Buenos Aires Province